Robert Frederick Carrington (born July 3, 1953) is a retired American professional basketball player. He was a 6'6" (198 cm) 195 lb (89 kg) guard and played collegiately at Boston College.

Carrington was selected with the 11th pick of the second round in the 1976 NBA draft by the Atlanta Hawks. He played for three teams (including the Indiana Pacers and New Jersey Nets) in 2 years, his final season spent with the San Diego Clippers in 1979–80. He also played in the Western Basketball Association.

Notes

External links
NBA stats @ basketballreference.com

1953 births
Living people
American men's basketball players
Atlanta Hawks draft picks
Basketball players from Massachusetts
Boston College Eagles men's basketball players
Indiana Pacers players
Jersey Shore Bullets players
New Jersey Nets players
Sportspeople from Brookline, Massachusetts
San Diego Clippers players
Shooting guards
Sportspeople from Braintree, Massachusetts
Archbishop Williams High School alumni